Gideon Doone is a Micronesian politician who served as the second elected Governor of Chuuk State. Gideon Doone is an alumna of Xavier High School, a Jesuit secondary school located on Chuuk.

References

Year of birth missing
People from Chuuk State
Governors of Chuuk State
Federated States of Micronesia politicians